"I'll Stand by You" is a 1994 song by the Pretenders.

I'll Stand by You may also refer to:

 "I'll Stand by You", a song from Wings (Bonnie Tyler album), 2006
 "I'll Stand by You", a song by Bruce Springsteen, used for Blinded by the Light (2019 film)

See also
 Stand by You (disambiguation)
 Stand by Me (disambiguation)